Carolyn Baldwin McHugh (born July 12, 1957) is an American lawyer and judge who serves as a United States circuit judge of the United States Court of Appeals for the Tenth Circuit. and former Presiding Judge of the Utah Court of Appeals.

Early life and education

McHugh was born in 1957, in Abington Township, Montgomery County, Pennsylvania while her parents were visiting her paternal grandparents. The family, which grew to include eight children, was actually living in Baltimore, Maryland at the time.

Shortly after McHugh's birth, her father was transferred to Andover, Massachusetts, and later, to Wilmington, Delaware. During her freshman year of high school, the family moved again to accommodate her father's career, relocating in Salt Lake City, Utah.

In 1975, McHugh graduated from Judge Memorial Catholic High School in Salt Lake City, where she participated in sports, student government, drill team, yearbook, and other activities. McHugh was selected as the Judge Memorial Sterling Scholar of English and Literature.

McHugh continued her education at the University of Utah, where she earned her Bachelor of Arts degree, magna cum laude, in 1978. After working for a year to earn her first year of tuition, McHugh entered the S.J. Quinney College of Law at the University of Utah in 1979. She received her Juris Doctor in 1982, graduating Order of the Coif, serving as an Editor of the Utah Law Review, and receiving many other honors, including:

 American Jurisprudence Awards for the Highest Grade in Antitrust, Constitutional Law II, Criminal Law, Evidence, Torts, and Trusts and Estates
 William H. Leary Scholar, 1979–82;
 Eccles Fellow for the 1981–82 school year.

Legal career 

McHugh served as a law clerk to Judge Bruce S. Jenkins of the United States District Court for the District of Utah from August 1982 to August 1983. She joined the Salt Lake City law firm now known as  Parr Brown Gee & Loveless as an associate in 1983, and was made a shareholder of the firm in 1987. During her private legal career, McHugh concentrated her practice in complex commercial litigation, in areas including antitrust, construction, environmental, real estate, financial lending, and title insurance. Throughout that time, McHugh also maintained an active pro bono practice, assisting persons of limited means with a variety of legal issues, including family law and small civil matters, while also serving as a court-appointed guardian ad litem.

Judicial career

State judicial service 
In August 2005, McHugh was appointed to the Court of Appeals by Utah Governor Jon M. Huntsman, Jr. and served in that capacity until her appointment as a federal circuit judge. In 2010, the Chief of Justice of the Utah Supreme Court appointed McHugh to serve as a member of the Judicial Conduct Commission to fill the vacancy created when her colleague, Judge Russell Bench, retired on December 31, 2009. In 2011, McHugh was appointed as the appellate court member of the Commission on Civic and Character Education, where she served with the Lieutenant Governor, members of the Utah Legislature, and representatives of the State Board of Education. On January 1, 2012, McHugh began a two-year term as the presiding judge of the Utah Court of Appeals.

Federal judicial service 

On May 16, 2013, President Barack Obama nominated McHugh to be a United States Circuit Judge of the United States Court of Appeals for the Tenth Circuit, to the seat vacated by Judge Michael R. Murphy, who assumed senior status on December 31, 2012.  Her nomination was approved unanimously by the Senate Judiciary Committee on January 16, 2014. On March 6, 2014 senator Harry Reid filed for cloture on her nomination. On March 10, 2014 the Senate invoked cloture on her nomination by a 62–34 vote. On March 12, 2014, McHugh was confirmed by a 98–0 vote. She received her commission on March 14, 2014.

Select cases

McHugh wrote for the state court in each of the following decisions.

Birch v. Fire Insurance Exchange, 2005 UT App 395, 122 P.3d 696. Randy Birch filed a claim with Fire Insurance Exchange (Fire Exchange) for losses incurred when a fire started by neighborhood children playing with matches spread to his home. Birch's policy with Fire Exchange provided coverage for the full replacement value of the damaged property, subject to a $500 deductible. Birch and Fire Exchange agreed that the replacement value of the property was $7732.91, and Fire Exchange paid Birch $7231.91, that amount minus the $500 deductible. Thereafter, Fire Exchange sought subrogation from the insurers of the neighborhood children who had started the fire, eventually agreeing to a 5% reduction in the replacement cost to reflect the depreciating of the property prior to the fire. Fire Exchange then forwarded Birch a check for $475, which represented 95% of the deductible. Birch objected on the grounds that he should have been paid 100% of the deductible before Fire Exchange could retain any of the amount collected from the children's insurers. When Fire Exchange refused to forward the additional 5% to Birch, he initiated a class action in the district court on behalf of himself and other similarly situated policy holders. The district court granted summary judgment in favor of Fire Exchange and Birch appealed. Birch claimed that Utah Supreme Court precedent required that he be “made whole” before Fire Exchange could retain any of the amounts obtained through subrogation. The Utah Court of Appeals rejected Birch's argument, holding as a matter of first impression that he had been made whole. The Court of Appeals noted that Birch actually lost depreciated property worth $7346.26. Due to his insurance contract with Fire Exchange, Birch was entitled to more than the value of the property at the time it was destroyed in replacement value, minus his deductible. Fire Exchange paid Birch $7232.91 in replacement value and $475 to reimburse his deductible for a total of $7707.91. Because the total Birch received was $361.65 more than his actual losses of $7346.26, the Court of Appeals concluded that he had been made whole and affirmed the decision of the district court granting summary judgment in favor of Fire Exchange.

Fordham v. Oldroyd, 2006 UT App 50, 131 P.3d 280, affirmed, 2007 UT  74, 171 P.3d 411.
State highway patrol trooper, Richard Fordham, brought an action against Ryan Oldroyd, a motorist whose negligence caused a traffic accident to which Fordham responded in an official capacity.  While Trooper Fordham was retrieving flares from the trunk of his patrol car to mark the Oldroyd accident, an approaching driver lost control of her care and struck Fordham, inflicting substantial injuries.  Trooper Fordham sued Oldroyd for the injuries he incurred when struck by the third party's vehicle, claiming that Oldroyd's negligence caused Fordham to be at the scene of the accident when the other vehicle lost control.  The District Court granted summary judgment in favor of Oldroyd and Fordham appealed.  The Court of Appeals noted that this case presented Utah's first opportunity to consider whether the professional-rescuer doctrine operates to bar a police officer's claim against the party whose negligence cause the officer to be present at the scene, but where the officer's injuries are actually inflicted by a third party.  Under the doctrine, a professional-rescuer, such as a police officer, cannot recover for injuries sustained when responding to an emergency from the person who negligently created the circumstances creating the emergency.  After considering the rationale for and against the doctrine, the Utah Court of Appeals concluded that it should be adopted in Utah.  The court cautioned, however, that the doctrine is narrow, barring suit only for the negligence that creates the need for the professional rescuer's presence in the first instance, and not for any negligence resulting in injuries thereafter.

Forsberg v. Bovis Lend Lease, Inc., 2008 UT  App 146, 184 P. 3d 610, cert. denied, 199 P.3d 367.
After an electrical subcontractor on a hospital construction project filed for bankruptcy, the trustees of certain employment benefit funds (the Funds) sued the general contractor, its surety, and the owner for unpaid fringe benefit contributions to the Funds and to foreclose on its mechanics’ lien.  The District Court granted the defendants’ motion for summary judgment, concluding that the Funds did not have standing, that fringe benefits were not recoverable either under the mechanics’ lien statute or the private payment bond statute, and that claims under either statute were preempted by ERISA.  The Funds appealed.  Each of the issues raised on appeal was an issue of first impression in Utah.  With respect to standing, the Utah Court of Appeals concluded that the Funds were within the zone of interest contemplated by the Utah Legislature because they were entitled to enforce the rights of the employees.  Next, the Court of Appeals held that Utah's mechanics’ lien and private bond statutes were not preempted by ERISA.  Finally, the appellate court determined that the fringe benefits were part of the value of labor or services provided on the project and therefore, could be recovered under the statutes.  Consequently, the Court of Appeals reversed the decision of the District Court.

State v. Marks, 2011 UT App 262, 262 P.3d 13.
Billy J. Marks was convicted of one count of sodomy on a child in connection with his conduct with his mentally challenged grandson and appealed his conviction.  Marks argued that the trial court violated his Sixth Amendment right to confrontation by excluding evidence of 1) grandson's possession of pornography, and 2) grandson's simulation of sexual intercourse with his younger sister.  According to Marks, the evidence was relevant to grandson's sexual knowledge and his ability to fabricate the allegations.  Marks also claimed that the evidence was insufficient to support the verdict because grandson's testimony was inherently inconsistent.  The Utah Court of Appeals recognized the tension between rule 412 of the Utah Rules of Evidence, Utah's rape shield law, that bars evidence of the alleged victim's other sexual behavior, and the confrontation clause of the United States Constitution, that protects the accused's right to present a complete defense.  The Court of Appeals concluded that a complete defense in a criminal case, includes the right to conduct reasonable cross-examination that is not limited arbitrarily or disproportionately to the purpose of any evidentiary rule limiting such cross-examination.  Considering the purposes of rule 412 and the facts and circumstances at issue, the Court of Appeals concluded that the exclusion of the evidence was not arbitrary or disproportionate to the purposes of Utah's rape shield rule.  The Court of Appeals also held that the victim's testimony was not so inconsistent as to be inherently improbable.  Thus, the court affirmed Mark's conviction.

Professional and community service

 1996 – Chairperson of the Utah State Bar Distinguished Committee
 1997 – University of Utah College of Law Young Alumna of the Year
 2001 – Christine M. Durham Utah Woman Lawyer of the Year
 2009 – Dorothy Merrill Brothers Award for the Advancement of Women in the Legal Profession

McHugh is a past president of Women Lawyers in Utah, past co-chair of the American Bar Association Conference of Environmental Law, and past chair of the  Needs of Children Committee of the Utah State Bar.  She has served as a master of the bench in the American Inns of Court program, and has completed training as a Fellow of the Advanced Science & Technology Adjudication Resource Center.

McHugh has been active in local charities including, Catholic Community Services, the Office of the Guardian Ad Litem, Utah Children, Big Brothers Big Sisters, and The Legal Aid Society.

References

External links

1957 births
Living people
21st-century American judges
Judges of the United States Court of Appeals for the Tenth Circuit
People from Abington Township, Montgomery County, Pennsylvania
Utah Court of Appeals judges
United States court of appeals judges appointed by Barack Obama
University of Utah alumni
Utah state court judges
21st-century American women judges